Salt Rock is a small town just north of Ballito and Shaka's Rock on the Dolphin Coast of KwaZulu-Natal, South Africa. It is a favorite holiday destination for many local South Africans. It is about 40 minutes north of Durban. There are plenty of fishing spots along the coast from Salt Rock, through Shaka's Rock to Ballito and Salmon Bay. Salt Rock owes much of its history to Basil Hulett and his wife Gwen who started not only the Salt Rock Hotel but went on to develop the town of Salt Rock as found today. Nightlife in the small town is limited with a handful of pubs and restaurants offering a variety of food and drinks. A new development, Sheffield Manor, is situated in Salt Rock as well as the newly built Tiffany's Shopping Mall.

As well as providing some fishing spots, there are reefs offshore. The main beach has lifeguards on duty, shark protected and a surfing site. Close to the main beach is a large tidal pool, which was originally built for guests staying at the hotel.

Geography 
Salt Rock is located on a series of hills overlooking the Indian Ocean with the altitude rising from the coastline to Tiffany’s Shopping Centre.  

Salt Rock is situated approximately 19 km south-east of KwaDukuza and 5 km north-east of Ballito. It is bordered by Sheffield Beach in the north, Shaka’s Rock to the south, Simbithi Eco Estate in the south-west and uMhlali to the west.

Infrastructure

Roads 

The N2 ‘North Coast Toll Road’ is the main highway running past Salt Rock, bypassing the seaside village to the west. The highway links Salt Rock to KwaDukuza to the north and Durban in the south-west. Access to Salt Rock from the N2 can be obtained through the Salt Rock Road interchange (Exit 214) or alternatively through the Shaka’s Rock interchange (Exit 212) in Shaka’s Rock. 

‘Salt Rock Road'/‘Basil Hulett Drive’/‘Ocean Drive’ is a small secondary road and the thoroughfare through Salt Rock which links the seaside village to Shaka’s Rock and Ballito in the south-west and uMhlali in the north-west.

References

Populated places in the KwaDukuza Local Municipality